The Oregon–Oregon State football rivalry (Civil War) is an American college football rivalry game played annually in the state of Oregon between the Ducks of the University of Oregon in Eugene and the Beavers of Oregon State University in Corvallis.

First played  in 1894, it is the fifth-most played college football rivalry game in the Football Bowl Subdivision. The series has now been played continuously since 1945. Though not officially recognized by the universities, the Platypus Trophy is awarded annually to the winning alumni association.

Series history
The game was first played in 1894 and has been contested 122 times through 2018, as well as continuously since 1945. Oregon leads the series  The game was not held in 1900, 1901, 1911, 1943, and 1944 and two games were played in 1896 and 1945. The first reference to the "Civil War" name was in 1929 and came into common use in 1937. Prior to that, it was called the "Oregon Classic" or the "State Championship Game."

The game is usually played in even-numbered years at the home field of Oregon State in Corvallis (Reser Stadium, formerly Parker Stadium, beginning in 1954) and in odd-numbered years at the home field of Oregon in Eugene (since 1967, Autzen Stadium). Seven games were played at Multnomah Field/Stadium (now Providence Park) in Portland: in 1908, 1917, 1933, 1934, 1938, 1950, and 1952. In an effort to mitigate rioting, the 1912 and 1913 games were played at a neutral site in Albany following riots after the 1910 game that led to the 1911 game's cancellation.

From 1997 through 2006, the home team won the game. The streak was snapped in 2007, when Oregon State beat Oregon at Autzen Stadium 38–31 in double overtime. In 2008, the Ducks returned the favor in Corvallis by beating OSU 65–38. The streak of visiting teams winning was snapped at two games in 2009 when the Ducks won 37–33 in Eugene.

From 1959 to 1961, the Platypus Trophy was awarded to the winner; it was lost for over forty years and finally found in 2005. Beginning with the 2007 game, it is awarded to the winning school's alumni association. A different trophy was awarded following the game in 1980.

Both share the longest winning streak in the series at eight games, but the Ducks had an undefeated run of thirteen games (1975–1987), with twelve wins and a scoreless tie in 1983.

Memorable games

The Ducks won a share of the PCC championship, but Stanford got the bid to the Rose Bowl.

1957: The Ducks had a 6–1 conference record and the Beavers were 5–2. A Beaver win at Hayward Field would give them a share of the conference title, but since the Beavers had been to the previous season's Rose Bowl, the Pacific Coast Conference's no-repeat rule meant that no matter what, the Ducks were headed for the Pasadena on New Year's Day, their first Rose Bowl appearance since January 1920. Both teams scored on their first possession, but that ended the scoring until late in the third quarter, when Beaver kicker Ted Searle put Oregon State on top, 10–7. A late fumble by the Ducks' Jim Shanley secured the win—but not the Rose Bowl—for Oregon State.

1959: The Ducks came into the game with just one loss. An Oregon win, coupled with a Washington loss, could have earned the Ducks a Rose Bowl invitation. Meanwhile, Oregon State was 2–6, its first losing record in five years. The Beavers started shakily, fumbling on their first two possessions and falling behind 7–0 in the first quarter. The rest was all Beavers as they salvaged their season with two touchdowns and a field goal to upset the Ducks, 15–7.

1969: With the score tied at seven and less than a minute left, Oregon State placekicker Mike Nehl attempted a 29-yard field goal to put the Beavers ahead. Nehl had already had one field goal blocked and missed one field goal on the day, and this one was blocked by Oregon's Jim Franklin, hit an official, bounced off the foot of Oregon linebacker Don Graham, and was recovered by Oregon State tight end Bill Plumeau at the Duck four-yard line. Nehl again came on to try his fourth field goal, and this time, connected on a 21-yard kick to give the Beavers a 10–7 win—the sixth on the way to what would be eight straight OSU wins in the series. This was the first game played on artificial turf.

1983: Played during a torrential rainstorm and pitting two mediocre squads against each other, the game ended in a scoreless tie, and is commonly known as the "Toilet Bowl" due to the very poor standard of play in the game, which featured eleven fumbles (six for turnovers), five interceptions, and four missed field goals. It was also the last Division I football game to end in a scoreless tie, with the NCAA instituting overtime rules in 1996. This was also the tenth and final tie in the series, six of which were scoreless.

1987: Oregon earned what was at the time the most lopsided victory in the series, a 44–0 drubbing led by Ducks quarterback Bill Musgrave.

1988: The Beavers last win was fourteen years earlier, and Oregon head coach Rich Brooks had not lost a game in the series in 21 attempts (18–0–3) as either a Ducks coach or Beavers coach or player. Both streaks ended on this day, as the Beavers scored two fourth quarter touchdowns for a 

1994: Oregon needed a win at hostile Parker Stadium to secure a bid to the Rose Bowl, but trailed  in the fourth quarter. Quarterback Danny O'Neil took the Ducks on a 70-yard drive that culminated in a 19-yard pass to Dino Philyaw for a  win and their first Rose Bowl in 37 years.

1998: Oregon State prevails in double overtime (the first ever overtime game in the series), 44–41. Beaver fans rushed the field after the first overtime after the Ducks failed to score on fourth down, but a pass interference penalty gave the Ducks another chance. It took officials 15 minutes to clear the field, after which the Ducks scored to send the game to a second overtime. The Ducks managed a field goal in their possession, but Beavers running back Ken Simonton scored to give the Beavers an upset win, their fifth win of the season, and their best record since 1971.

2000: Oregon came into the game ranked #5 in the country with Oregon State at #8, the first time both teams have been ranked in the top 10 simultaneously. With a win, Oregon would go to the Rose Bowl; the Beavers needed a win to force a tie between the two teams, and keep alive hopes of going to the Rose Bowl. Oregon State won the game 23–13, but was denied a Rose Bowl bid when Washington beat Washington State later the same day. Oregon State was extended an at-large invitation to BCS' Fiesta Bowl, where they defeated Notre Dame 41–9.

2001: Oregon came into the game needing only a victory over their arch-rival for the team's first outright Pacific-10 Conference championship since 1994 and a trip to the Fiesta Bowl; the Beavers needed a win to secure a winning season. After OSU initially took a 6–3 lead into halftime, Oregon rallied behind a Keenan Howry punt return for a touchdown to give the Ducks a lead they would not relinquish, amidst a driving rainstorm. Final score: Ducks 17, Beavers 14.

2007: Oregon State wins 38–31 in double overtime at Autzen, the first road team to win the game in 10 attempts. The game featured a blocked Oregon State field goal with 1:01 remaining, followed by a missed Oregon field goal as regulation expired.

2008 Oregon State needed a victory to get a bid to the 2009 Rose Bowl, their first Rose Bowl in 44 years. Instead, Oregon ran away with a 65–38 blowout, setting series records for the most points scored by one team and the most total points scored.

2009: Called the "War for the Roses", because it was the first time a win guaranteed a Rose Bowl berth. In a back-and-forth game, Oregon won, 37–33. The Ducks represented the Pac-10 in the 2010 Rose Bowl, their first appearance since 1995.

2010: Oregon, coming into the game second in the Bowl Championship Series (BCS) standings, needed to win the game to secure a spot in the BCS championship game. Oregon State, at 5–6, needed a win to become bowl eligible. With ESPN's College GameDay staged in Corvallis for the first time, the Ducks won 37–20 to secure a spot against Auburn in the national title game.

2016: Oregon State RB Ryan Nall rushed for 155 yards and 4 touchdowns, as Oregon State beat Oregon 34–24, after the Beavers outscored the Ducks 13–0 in the 4th quarter to take the lead, and snap the Ducks' 8-game win streak in the rivalry from 2008–2015, which was tied for the longest ever in the rivalry. After the game, the Corvallis crowd stormed the field in celebration.

2017: Both the Ducks and Beavers entered this game carrying sub-par seasons. The Ducks stood at 6–5, while the Beavers were riding a nine-game losing streak at  The game was one for the history books, with Oregon rolling to a 69–10 win, setting records for the series in both points scored and margin of victory. It was Oregon's ninth win in the last ten meetings, and it offered a sense of revenge for the Ducks after dropping the prior year's meeting in Corvallis. Royce Freeman scored two rushing TDs in the first half of to break OSU's Ken Simonton's all-time Pac-12 rushing touchdown record, which stood at 59 for 16 years. It would mark Royce's 60th rushing touchdown for the Ducks. He also piled up 122 rushing yards which moved him into seventh all-time in NCAA history.

2020: In the COVID-19 pandemic-shortened 2020 season, No. 15 Oregon entered the game with a 3–0 record to Oregon State's 1–2. In the game Jermar Jefferson rushed for 226 yards which is the most rushing yards ever in a game in the rivalry. After dropping behind by 12 entering the fourth quarter, Jermar Jefferson led the Beavers to an improbable 41–38 win on a foggy night in Corvallis in front of an empty stadium, knocking the Ducks out of playoff contention and notching the Beavers' first victory over a ranked opponent since 2014.

2022: In the 2022 edition of the rivalry, Oregon entered the game ranked No. 9 in the country and Oregon State entered the game ranked No. 21 in the country. The Ducks stormed out to a 31-10 lead by the third quarter, but the Beavers, behind a potent rushing attack, scored touchdowns on all of their next four drives to take a 38-34 lead. The Ducks then went on a time-consuming drive, but failed to convert a fourth and goal at the Oregon State 3 yard line, thus allowing Oregon State to take possession. The Beavers then picked up a first down and ran out the clock to complete an improbable comeback.

Notable game-related incidents

1910: Following a 12–0 Oregon victory in Corvallis, fans of both teams began a verbal argument that escalated into exceedingly rowdy behavior as Ducks fans returned to the train station to leave.  The UO's public relations department spread stories of Oregon Agricultural College hooliganism to the statewide press, offending students of OAC and causing the rivalry to be suspended for 1911.

1937: After defeating Oregon 14–0 in Corvallis, Oregon State fans had a large rally the next evening that lasted for six hours.  Approximately 2,000 Oregon State students decided to caravan the following day to Eugene and have another celebration.  State police initially halted the group, then agreed to lead them through the town if they agreed to behave.  However, once Oregon students got out of class, the situation escalated with Ducks pelting Beavers with tomatoes and water balloons, some Oregon State students were thrown into the millrace, and other OSU students taken to Skinner Butte, stripped and forced to repaint the "O" hillside letter yellow and slide down the painted surface.

1954: Approximately 50 UO students infiltrated Corvallis and lit the traditional OSU homecoming bonfire early.  While it had been done before, this time OSU students were able to capture 25 UO students and hold them "prisoner".  The captured students had their heads shaved, were painted orange and black and some were forced to do menial labor for OSU fraternities.  One captured UO student was marched through the OSU campus with a sign that said "I'm a dumb Duck". Meanwhile, the UO raiding party kidnapped a single OSU student and paraded him around the UO campus.

1960: A UO student abducted the OSU homecoming queen from the front of her home in Corvallis.  She was returned unharmed thirty minutes later, but before that the OSU student body president received a ransom note demanding he ride a child's scooter to the center of Eugene and make a public appeal for her return.

1972: After a 30–3 UO victory at Corvallis which ended an eight-game win streak in the series by the Beavers, Ducks fans stormed the OSU field to take down goal posts; after taking down the south goalposts, Beavers fans attempted to defend the north goalposts, resulting in a large brawl.

2010: After a 37–20 victory which sent the Ducks to the 2011 Tostitos BCS National Championship Game, a group of Duck fans lit on fire a t-shirt with the phrase "I hate your Ducks" over the Beavers logo on the field. The resulting fire caused significant damage to the artificial turf. Police used a photo of the incident from the Portland Tribune to arrest a University of Oregon student and charge him with riot and several misdemeanors.

2022: Following Oregon State's 38-34 win at Reser Stadium, UO linebacker DJ Johnson punched an Oregon State fan after what appeared to be some arguing between the two. No action has yet been taken on the altercation.

Game results

Coaching records since 1945

Oregon

Oregon State

 Last tie was in 1983, overtime began in 1996 in Division I-A (two: 1998, 2007; both won by OSU in double overtime)
 Two games were played in 1896 and 1945.

See also
 Platypus Trophy
 Oregon–Oregon State rivalry
 List of NCAA college football rivalry games
 List of most-played college football series in NCAA Division I

References

External links

College football rivalries in the United States
Oregon Ducks football
Oregon State Beavers football
Recurring sporting events established in 1894
1894 establishments in Oregon
Name changes due to the George Floyd protests